Andreessen Horowitz (also called a16z, legal name AH Capital Management, LLC) is a private American venture capital firm, founded in 2009 by Marc Andreessen and Ben Horowitz. The company is headquartered in Menlo Park, California.

Andreessen Horowitz invests in both early-stage start-ups and established growth companies. Its investments span the healthcare, consumer, cryptocurrency, gaming, fintech, education and enterprise IT (including cloud computing, security, and software as a service) industries.

Founding and partnering

Between 2006 and 2010, Marc Andreessen and Ben Horowitz actively invested in technology companies. Separately, and together, they invested $4 million in 45 start-ups including Twitter. During this time, the two became known as "super angel" investors.

On July 6, 2009, Andreessen and Horowitz launched their venture capital fund with an initial capitalization of $300 million. In November 2010, at a time when the field of venture capitalism was contracting, the company raised another $650 million for a second venture fund. In less than two years, the firm was managing a total of $1.2 billion under the two funds.

In May 2011, Andreessen ranked number 10 on the 2011 Forbes Midas List of Tech's Top Investors while he and Horowitz ranked number 6 on Vanity Fair's 2011 New Establishment List and number 1 on CNET's 2011 most influential investors list.

As of March 27, 2014, the firm managed $4 billion in assets after the closing of its fourth fund at $1.5 billion.

In addition to Andreessen and Horowitz, the firm's general partners include John O'Farrell, Scott Weiss, Jeff Jordan, Peter Levine, Chris Dixon, Vijay Pande, Martin Casado and Sriram Krishnan. In March 2019, it was reported that Andreessen Horowitz was opening an office in San Francisco.

In January 2022, Andreessen Horowitz raised $9 billion for its venture capital, growth-stage and biotech-focused vehicles.

As of April 2022, the firm manages $28.2 billion in assets.

Notable investments

2009 
In 2009, Andreessen Horowitz made its two first investments: one in business management SaaS developer Apptio and the other in Skype stock. According to Horowitz, the investment was seen as risky by other experts in the field who believed the company would be crippled by ongoing intellectual property litigation and direct competitive attacks from Google and Apple. The company's founders viewed the investment as a success following Skype's sale to Microsoft in May 2011 for $8.5 billion.

2010–2011 
In 2010, Andreessen Horowitz invested $10 million in cloud company Okta while leading its Series A Round.

In 2011, Andreessen Horowitz invested $80 million in Twitter, becoming the first venture firm that held stock in all four of the highest-valued, privately held social media companies at the time: Facebook, Groupon, Twitter, and Zynga. Andreessen Horowitz has also invested in Airbnb, Lytro, Jawbone, Belly, Foursquare, Stripe and other high-tech companies.

2012–2013 
In 2012, Andreessen Horowitz invested in 156 companies, including the 90 companies in its portfolio, and 66 start-ups through its funding of Y Combinator's Start Fund. The company invested $100 million in GitHub, which netted over $1 billion for the fund when GitHub was acquired by Microsoft for $7.5 billion. In 2013, Andreessen Horowitz invested in Clinkle, Coinbase, Databricks, Lyft, Oculus VR, PagerDuty, Pixlee, Ripple, Soylent, Swiftype and uBiome.

2014–2015 
In 2014, the firm led a $57 million Series B round in the A/B testing startup Optimizely. That same year the company invested in several more companies, including Tanium for $90 million, BuzzFeed, and Forward Networks. In 2015, the firm invested $40 million in Stack Exchange, $2.8 million in Distelli, and $80 million in cloud-based CAD software company Onshape. Also in 2015 Andreessen Horowitz invested in the blogging platform Medium, Samsara, Improbable, Honor, Inc., OpenBazaar, a blockchain startup, and nootropics and biohacking company Nootrobox.

2016–2019 
In 2016, the firm led an $8.1 million Series A round in Everlaw, a legal technology company, and led a $3.5 million Series Seed round in RapidAPI, an API connection platform for developers. Also in 2016, the firm invested $2 million in Cardiogram, a digital health company, and Apeel Sciences, a food science business.

In 2017, the firm invested in Sigma, Health IQ, Asimov, and Cadre.

In 2018, the firm raised $300 million for a dedicated cryptocurrency fund. It has also invested in Imply, Smartcar, PeerStreet, CryptoKitties, Dfinity, Earnin, Pindrop, Tenfold, and Very Good Security.

In 2019 the firm provided $15.3 million in Series A funding to Substack, some of which went to bringing high-profile writers into that network.
 In June 2019 the firm also invested in a $9.2 million Series A round in AnyRoad, an experiential marketing platform, and David Ulevitch from Andreessen Horowitz joined the AnyRoad board.

2020
In 2020, the firm led a $150 million Series G round in Roblox, a social video game platform for children.

In April 2020, the firm led a $50 million Series D round in Figma, a vector graphics editor and prototyping tool.

Also in April 2020, the firm raised $515 million for a second cryptocurrency-focused fund.

In May 2020, the firm made a $12 million Series A investment in Clubhouse ($10 million in primary capital plus $2 million toward purchasing shares), an audio-chat social networking app valued at nearly $100 million as of December 2020.

2021
In January 2021, the firm led a $100 million Series B for the audio-chat social networking app Clubhouse, reportedly valuing it at $1 billion. In April 2021, it led a $220 million Series D for mobile banking and fintech company Current.

In July 2021, the firm led a $100 million Series A for the NFT marketplace OpenSea, reportedly valuing it at $1.5 billion.

In September 2021, the firm led an $18 million Series A fundraise in Pearl Health, a healthcare technology company.

In October 2021, A16z led the round to Raise $150M Series B at $3B Valuation in Vietnamese studio Sky Mavis, the developer of crypto-based online game Axie Infinity.

2022
In March 2022, Andreessen Horowitz led the round to raise $450 million at a $4B Valuation in Yuga Labs (known for Bored Apes). In October 2022, it was reported that the US Securities and Exchange Commission were investigating Yuga Labs, due to concerns that sales of their digital assets violated US investment laws.

In March 2022,  the firm led  $27 million Series A for the Rutter, a universal API for commerce data.

In March 2022, A16z with Lux Capital co-led an $90 million round of Los Angeles-based machine-parts start-up Hadrian Automation.

In May 2022, the firm announced the launch of its largest fund to date at $4.5 billion. The fund is set to focus on cryptocurrency and blockchain technologies. The firm stated that $1.5 billion was allocated to seed investments while the remaining $3 billion would be earmarked for venture investments.

In August 2022, the firm announced it would be investing about $350 million in Flow, the latest organization begun by WeWork founder Adam Neumann. The purported aim of Flow is to create a branded product in the housing market with consistent community features, reimagining how real estate works in the US.  The decision was met with some criticism due to Neumann's previous business issues in his time at WeWork. 

The firm committed to $400 million in equity investment towards acquisition of Twitter by Elon Musk that completed in October 2022.

Structure
Andreessen Horowitz partners work on behalf of all its portfolio companies, an approach modeled after the Hollywood talent agency, Creative Artists Agency. In 2010, the company hired Margit Wennmachers, a marketing executive at the partner level.

As of 2011, the firm had maintained a database of designers, coders, and executives and used it to help fill positions at its start-ups. Former U.S. Treasury Secretary Larry Summers became a special advisor to Andreessen Horowitz in June 2011.

In September 2012, former Washington D.C. mayor Adrian Fenty was appointed Andreessen Horowitz's second special advisor. Fenty was hired to advise the firm's portfolio companies on working with local, state, and federal governments.

In 2019, the firm applied to restructure as a registered investment adviser in order to have more freedom to take up riskier bets like cryptocurrency.

References

External links
 Andreessen-Horowitz web site
 Frank Chen, Partner at Andreessen Horowitz: 'Are you a mercenary or a missionary?'  (04.24.2013)

 
Venture capital firms of the United States
Companies based in Menlo Park, California
Financial services companies established in 2009
2009 establishments in California